The following are the winners of the 9th annual ENnie Awards, held in 2009:

References

External links
 2009 ENnie Awards

Ennie Award winners
Ennie Award winners
ENnies winners